May Sutton defeated Constance Wilson 6–4, 6–2 in the All Comers' Final, and then defeated the reigning champion Dorothea Lambert Chambers 6–1, 6–4 in the challenge round to win the ladies' singles tennis title at the 1907 Wimbledon Championships.

Draw

Challenge round

All comers' finals

Top half

Section 1

Section 2

Bottom half

Section 3

Section 4

References

External links

Women's Singles
Wimbledon Championship by year – Women's singles
Wimbledon Championships - Singles
Wimbledon Championships - Singles